KKAW (107.3 FM) was a radio station licensed to Albin, Wyoming, United States. The station was owned by Victor A. Michael, Jr., through licensee Laramie Mountain Broadcasting, LLC.

History
The station went on the air as KKAW on 1998-06-26.

On February 19, 2008, KKAW changed its format from country to oldies, simulcasting KRRR 104.9 FM Cheyenne, Wyoming. It changed its format back to country in 2012. On June 13, 2013, KKAW went silent. The station changed its call sign to KKWY on July 15, 2013, and back to the current KKAW on February 24, 2014.

On August 27, 2014, the station's owners notified the Federal Communications Commission that KKAW had been silent for more than twelve months, and requested cancellation of KKAW's license.

References

External links

KAW
Defunct radio stations in the United States
Radio stations disestablished in 2014
Radio stations established in 1998
1998 establishments in Wyoming
2014 disestablishments in Wyoming
KAW